Jorge Drexler is a Uruguayan singer-songwriter who has received awards and nominations for his contributions to the music industry. Drexler released his first album in 1992, La Luz Que Sabe Robar, and following an invitation from Spanish singer-songwriter Joaquín Sabina, he relocated from Uruguay to Spain, where he signed an international recording contract. In 2005, he received Uruguay's first Academy Award, taking Best Original Song for "Al Otro Lado del Río", written for the film The Motorcycle Diaries; the track also received Latin Grammy and World Soundtrack Awards nominations. Drexler has been nominated four times at the Grammy Awards, for the albums Eco (2004), 12 Segundos de Oscuridad (2006), Cara B (2008), Bailar en la Cueva (2014), and Salvavidas de Hielo (2018); for Bailar en la Tierra, he won the award for Best Singer-Songwriter Album at the 15th Latin Grammy Awards. At the same ceremony, the singer earned a Latin Grammy for Record of the Year  for his song "Universos Paralelos", performed with Chilean artist Ana Tijoux. In 2022, Drexler won six Latin Grammy Awards, including his first for Song of the Year for "Tocarte", his collaboration with C. Tangana.

For his work writing Spanish-language versions of singles by Colombian singer-songwriter Shakira, he has received five ASCAP Latin Awards. Drexler received his only Goya Award in 2010 with the song "Que El Soneto Nos Tome Por Sorpresa", written for the Spanish film Lope; the same year he was named Commander of the Order of Isabella the Catholic for his musical contributions. For his acting debut in the film La Suerte en Tus Manos (2012), Drexler was nominated for a Premio Sur in Argentina for Breakthrough Male Performance. Overall, Drexler has received 13 awards from 53 nominations.

Academy Awards
The Academy Awards are awarded annually by the Academy of Motion Picture Arts and Sciences in the United States. Drexler has received one award.

|-
|rowspan="1" scope="row"| 2005
|scope="row"| "Al Otro Lado del Río"
|scope="row"| Best Original Song
| 
|-

ASCAP Latin Awards
The ASCAP Latin Awards are awarded annually by the American Society of Composers, Authors and Publishers in the United States. Drexler has received five awards.

|-
|2010
| "Loba"
|rowspan="4"|Pop/Ballad
| 
|-
|rowspan="4"|2011
|scope="row"| "Did It Again (Lo Hecho Está Hecho)"
| 
|-
|scope="row"| "Gitana"
| 
|-
|rowspan="2"| "Waka Waka (This Time for Africa)"
| 
|-
|scope="row"|Television
| 
|-

Gardel Awards
The Gardel Awards are awarded annually by the Chamber of Phonograms and Videograms Producers in Argentina. Drexler has received two nominations.

|-
|rowspan="1" scope="row"| 2000
|scope="row"| Frontera
|rowspan="2"| Best Male Pop Album
| 
|-
|rowspan="1" scope="row"| 2001
|scope="row"| Sea
| 
|-

Goya Awards
The Goya Awards are awarded annually by the Academia de las Artes y las Ciencias Cinematográficas in Spain. Drexler has received one award from two nominations.

|-
|rowspan="1" scope="row"| 2008
|scope="row"| "La Vida Secreta de las Pequeñas Cosas"
|rowspan="2"| Best Original Song
| 
|-
|rowspan="1" scope="row"| 2010
|scope="row"| "Que El Soneto Nos Tome Por Sorpresa"
| 
|-

Grammy Awards
The Grammy Awards are awarded annually by the National Academy of Recording Arts and Sciences in the United States. Drexler has received six nominations.

|-
|rowspan="1" scope="row"| 2006
|scope="row"| Eco
|rowspan="3"| Best Latin Pop Album
| 
|-
|rowspan="1" scope="row"| 2008
|scope="row"| 12 Segundos de Oscuridad
| 
|-
|-
|rowspan="1" scope="row"| 2009
|scope="row"| Cara B
| 
|-
|rowspan="1" scope="row"| 2015
|scope="row"| Bailar en la Cueva
|rowspan="3"| Best Latin Rock, Urban or Alternative Album
| 
|-
|rowspan="1" scope="row"| 2018
|scope="row"| Salvavidas de Hielo
| 
|-
|rowspan="1" scope="row"| 2023
|scope="row"| Tinta y Tiempo
| 
|-

Latin Grammy Awards
The Latin Grammy Awards are awarded annually by the Latin Academy of Recording Arts & Sciences in the United States. As of 2022, Drexler has received thirteen awards from 31 nominations.

|-
|rowspan="1" scope="row"| 2002
|scope="row"| Sea
|scope="row"| Best Male Pop Vocal Album
| 
|-
|rowspan="1" scope="row"| 2005
|scope="row"| "Al Otro Lado del Río"
|scope="row"| Song of the Year
| 
|-
|rowspan="1" scope="row"| 2007
|scope="row"| 12 Segundos de Oscuridad
|scope="row" rowspan="2"| Best Singer-Songwriter Album
| 
|-
|rowspan="4" scope="row"| 2010
|scope="row"| Amar la Trama
| 
|-
|scope="row"| La Trama Circular
|scope="row"| Best Long Form Music Video
| 
|-
|rowspan="2"| "Una Canción Me Trajo Hasta Aquí"
|scope="row"| Record of the Year
| 
|-
|rowspan="2"| Song of the Year
| 
|-
|rowspan="1" scope="row"| 2011
|scope="row"| "Que El Soneto Nos Tome Por Sorpresa"
| 
|-
|rowspan="1" scope="row"| 2012
|scope="row"| "1987"
|scope="row"| Best Alternative Song
| 
|-
|rowspan="1" scope="row"| 2013
|scope="row"| "Sacar la Voz" 
|scope="row"| Best Urban Song
| 
|-
|rowspan="4" scope="row"| 2014
|rowspan="2"| Bailar en la Cueva
|scope="row"| Album of the Year
| 
|-
|scope="row"| Best Singer-Songwriter Album
| 
|-
|rowspan="2"| "Universos Paralelos" 
|scope="row"| Song of the Year
| 
|-
|rowspan="4" scope="row"| Record of the Year
| 
|-
|rowspan="1" scope="row"| 2015
|scope="row"| "Ella Es"
| 
|-
|rowspan="1" scope="row"| 2017
|scope="row"| "El Surco"
| 
|-
|rowspan="4" scope="row"| 2018
|rowspan="2"| "Telefonía"
| 
|-
|scope="row"| Song of the Year
| 
|-
|rowspan="2"| Salvavidas de Hielo
|scope="row"| Album of the Year
| 
|-
|scope="row"| Best Singer-Songwriter Album
| 
|-
|rowspan="1" scope="row"| 2020
|scope="row"| "Codo con Codo"
|scope="row"| Song of the Year
| 
|-
|rowspan="2" scope="row"| 2021
|rowspan="1" scope="row"| "Nominao" 
|rowspan="1" scope="row"| Best Alternative Song
| 
|-
|rowspan="1" scope="row"| "Hong Kong" 
|rowspan="1" scope="row"| Best Pop/Rock Song
| 
|-
|rowspan="8" scope="row"| 2022
| rowspan="2"|Tinta y Tiempo
| Album of the Year
| 
|-
| Best Singer-Songwriter Album
| 
|-
| rowspan="3"|"Tocarte" 
| Record of the Year
| 
|-
| Song of the Year
| 
|-
| Best Short Form Music Video
| 
|-
| "La Guerra de la Concordia"
| Best Pop Song
| 
|-
| "El Día Que Estrenaste el Mundo"
| Best Alternative Song
| 
|-
| "Vento Sardo" 
| Best Portuguese Language Song
| 
|-

Lo Nuestro Award
The Lo Nuestro Award is an honor presented annually by American television network Univision. Drexler received one nomination.

|-
|rowspan="1" scope="row"| 2020
|scope="row"| "Blue (Diminuto Planeta Azul)"
|scope="row"| Video of the Year
| 
|-

Málaga Film Festival
The Málaga Film Festival is a film festival held annually in Málaga, Spain. Drexler received one award.

|-
|rowspan="1" scope="row"| 2009
|scope="row"| Un Instante Preciso
|scope="row"| Biznaga de Plata
| 
|-

MTV Video Music Awards Latinoamerica
The MTV Video Music Awards Latinoamerica were awarded annually by the MTV Networks Latin America in the United States. Drexler received one nomination.

|-
|rowspan="1" scope="row"| 2002
|scope="row"| Himself
|scope="row"| Best New Artist — South
| 
|-

Premio de la Música
The Premio de la Música was awarded annually by the Sociedad General de Autores y Editores in Spain. Drexler received two awards from four nominations.

|-
|rowspan="1" scope="row"| 2005
|scope="row"| Eco
|scope="row"| Album of the Year
| 
|-
|rowspan="1" scope="row"| 2007
|scope="row"| 12 Segundos de Oscuridad
|scope="row"| Album of the Year
| 
|-
|rowspan="1" scope="row"| 2009
|scope="row"| Cara B
|scope="row"| Pop Album of the Year
| 
|-
|rowspan="1" scope="row"| 2011
|scope="row"| La Trama Circular
|scope="row"| Best Musical Audiovisual Production
| 
|-

Graffiti Award
The Graffiti Award (Premio Graffiti) is awarded annually by media members specialized in music and entertainment in Uruguay. Drexler has received one award from eight nominations.

|-
|rowspan="4" scope="row"| 2005
|rowspan="3" scope="row"| Eco
|scope="row"| Best Album
| 
|-
|scope="row"| Best Songwriter
| 
|-
|scope="row"| Best Solo Artist
| 
|-
|rowspan="1" scope="row"| www.jorgedrexler.com
|scope="row"| Best Website
| 
|-
|rowspan="2" scope="row"| 2007
|rowspan="1" scope="row"| 12 Segundos de Oscuridad
|scope="row"| Best Solo Artist
| 
|-
|rowspan="1" scope="row"| "Transoceanica"
|scope="row"| Best Music Video
| 
|-
|rowspan="2" scope="row"| 2009
|rowspan="2" scope="row"| Cara B
|scope="row"| Best Live Album
| 
|-
|scope="row"| Best Popular Music Album and Urban Song
| 
|-

Premio Sur
The Premio Sur is awarded annually by the Academy of Cinematography Arts and Sciences Awards in Argentina. Drexler has received one nomination for his performance in the film La Suerte En Tus Manos.

|-
|rowspan="1" scope="row"| 2012
|scope="row"| Himself
|scope="row"| Breakthrough Male Performance
| 
|-

Shock Awards
The Shock Awards are awarded annually by the Colombian magazine Shock. Drexler has received one nomination.

|-
|rowspan="1" scope="row"| 2015
|scope="row"| Bailar en la Cueva
|scope="row"| Latin American Album of the Year
| 
|-

World Soundtrack Awards
The World Soundtrack Awards are awarded annually by the FIAPF during the Flanders International Film Festival Ghent in Belgium. Drexler has received one nomination.

|-
|rowspan="1" scope="row"| 2005
|scope="row"| "Al Otro Lado del Río"
|scope="row"| Best Original Song Written Directly for a Film
| 
|-

References

Drexler, Jorge